The Josvainiai Forest is a forest in Kėdainiai District Municipality, central Lithuania, located  to the west from Kėdainiai and 4 km to the north from Josvainiai. It consists of smaller forests: Josvainiai Forest (proper), Medininkai Forest, Giraitė. The rivers Smilga, Smilgaitis and Tranys drain the forest (the Nevėžis basin). 

As of 2005, 52 % of the area was covered by birch, 24 % by spruce, 5 % by aspen, 8 % by ash, 3 % by oak, 3 % by black alder, 3 % by white alder, 2 % by pine tree groups. The fauna of the forest consists of wild boar, roe deer, red fox, raccoon dog, pine marten, also there are hazel grouses, black storks, Eurasian woodcocks, common buzzards, sparrowhawks, northern goshawk, owls. The forest is included into Dotnuva-Josvainiai Biosphere Polygon, also there is the Smilga Landscape Sanctuary in the forest.

During the Soviet era, there was a rocket base (now in ruins) in the forest nearby Keleriškiai. There are Barsukynė, Palainiškiai, Čiukiškiai, Stasiūnai, Grašva villages inside the forest or on its edges.

Images

References

Forests of Lithuania
Kėdainiai District Municipality